Homps Lock is a single chamber lock on the Canal du Midi. It lies east of the small town of Homps in the Aude region of  Languedoc, France. The adjacent locks are Ognon Lock 689 metres to the east and Jouarres Lock 3688 metres to the west.

See also
Locks on the Canal du Midi

Locks on the Canal du Midi